Vyanda is a town and seat of the Commune of Vyanda in Bururi Province in southern Burundi. It has a population of 29,685 and by road it is located 34.9 kilometres southeast of Bururi and 13.2 kilometres northeast of Kigwena.

Overview
On 29 April 1972 a massacre took place here.

To the south is the 40 square kilometre Vyanda Forest Nature Reserve, noted for its miombo woodland habitat, Zambezian flora and Chimpanzees.

References

External links
Satellite map at Maplandia.com

Populated places in Bururi Province